A Kind of Magic (known as Magic – La Famille Féerique in France) is a French animated television series created by Michel Coulon and Marc du Pontavice, the creators of Oggy and the Cockroaches based upon Arthur de Pins's original design. It was produced by French animation company Xilam Animation with the participation of France 3 and Disney Television France in Season 1, Gulli and Canal J for Season 2. The series was directed by Charles Vaucelle for Season 1 and William Renaud for Season 2, the character designer by David Gilson and the executive producer by Marc Du Pontavice.

The series first aired in 2008 on Disney Channel France and France 3. The series was rated the most popular series at the 2007 MIPCOM Junior trade show, attracting over 280 buyers.

A second season started airing in 2018. The second series aired on Canal J.

It is now a web series on the YouTube channel with the same name.

Synopsis 
The story deals with a 10-year-old child named Tom, and his family's problems, including his older sister Cindy (14 years old), who is crazy after every boy she sees, his toad 'His Highness', his evil maternal aunt Ferocia who wants to turn him evil as well, his ditzy fairy mother Willow and his vegetarian ogre father Gregore who have been exiled from Fairyland and now have to live on Earth.

Characters 
Tom (voiced by Sauvane Delanoë) is the main protagonist and Cindy's 10-year-old younger brother. Clever, spontaneous and mischievous, Tom has the presence of mind of a boy who has had to take care of himself from very young. Thanks to his limitless imagination and instinctive quick reflexes, he is able to convince anyone of anything. This skill is very useful to his absent-minded family members who are always forgetting they no longer live in a world of magical creatures.
Cindy (voiced by Kelly Marot), is Tom's 14-year-old older sister. Stubborn, rebellious, and very romantic, Cindy knows that a better future awaits her. In Fairyland, she was responsible for cleaning the sewers of the kingdom, but in the Real World, she dreams of grand projects and a more agreeable life. Like all teenagers (adolescents), she worries about being accepted by the other children at school. In general she opposes the use of magic because she considers it distasteful, but she makes use of it when it helps her accomplish what she wants.
Ferocia (voice by Colette 'Coco' Noël) is Tom and Cindy's aunt, Willow's sister, a witch and an anti-hero (also a main villain when she has power). Many words describe Ferocia that her personality has: horrible, cruel, wicked and a pain in the rear, but also neutral. She delights in causing mayhem, even for her own family. She laughed when her brother planned to rob her sister and brother-in-law of all their savings and she enjoyed frightening Tom with the idea of being forgotten if his parents had more children. She adores tormenting Gregore and will take every opportunity to torment him. She also likes to taunt His Highness about his ugliness. Ferocia has a macabre sense of humor and sees horror films as comedies. When she had her powers she was a villain to be feared.
Willow (voiced by Claire Guyot) is Tom and Cindy's mother, Ferocia's sister and Gregore's wife. Willow is optimistic, light-hearted, positive, motherly and carefree. She also has a mischievous side as seen in "Meet The Parent" and "Frames!". She believes that good will always conquer evil. She can be strict when she has to and she can be overprotective shown in the Wishing Powder. Willow is also a strong woman, always honest with her heritage and who she is. While she tried to integrate into the real world, she refused to forget who and what she was. She also stood up by herself, not letting anyone take her for granted and not letting the world disappoint her. Underneath her cheerful, positive and carefree personality, Willow is a very smart woman. However, she is very dashing and innocent. Even as a fairy in the real world and wonderland, she uses her wings and flight. In addition, she uses her magic with her wand to do anything.
Gregore (voiced by François Seiner (Season 1); Jérémy Prévost for season 2) is Tom and Cindy's father and Willow's husband. Despite giving up on becoming a reformed goblin, he is a sweet, kind, gentle and responsible father to Tom and Cindy. In addition, he is a father, always a little clumsy, kind, cheerful, but cowardly and afraid of anything (except dentists). Towards a difficult personality when he dislikes Cindy's antics and mischief along with Ferocié's laughter, calling his name and insulting him except for whatever happens to him, he's often angry, fierce, aggressive, hot-tempered (but short-tempered) and always evil.

Production
The musical theme is an adaptation of the song A Kind of Magic by the British band Queen. On 3 November 2015, Xilam announced the production of a second season from 2016. This will contain fifty-two thirteen-minute episodes.

Episodes

References

2000s French animated television series
2006 French television series debuts
Animated television series about children
Animated television series about families
Disney animated television series
French children's animated fantasy television series
French flash animated television series
Xilam